The August 7th Memorial Park is located at the 1998 United States embassy bombings scene along Haile Selassie Avenue in Nairobi, Kenya. It contains a notice board listing the names of all people that were reported dead after the incident.

References

Nairobi
Parks in Kenya
History of Nairobi